Rajahar  is a village development committee in Nawalparasi District in the Lumbini Zone of southern Nepal. It lies in and is intersected by Mahendra Highway. Rajahar Bazar is one of the oldest town of the area. This area is highly served by weekly street market every Saturday commonly known as Haat Bazar. Razahar is also the home town of Devchuli Higher Secondary School and Devchuli College, the oldest in the district.  At the time of the 1991 Nepal census it had a population of 7839 people living in 1387 individual households.

References

Rajahar has the first higher secondary school in Nawalparasi district named Devchuli Higher secondary school.

Populated places in Nawalpur District